Chris Knights (born 25 September 1986) is a former professional Australian rules footballer who played for the Adelaide Football Club and Richmond Football Club in the Australian Football League (AFL).

AFL career
Chris played his junior football with the Waverley Blues Football Club and also the Vermont Football Club before being selected to play for the Eastern Ranges in the TAC Cup. Knights, a dual Victorian Metropolitan under-18 representative (2003/04), was selected in the 2004 AFL Draft by the Adelaide Football Club with the 56th selection.

Knights was eased into the AFL system, playing just two games in the 2005 season and ten in 2006 before cementing his spot in the side in 2007, missing only one game.

Knights saw more action in 2007, developing into a midfielder and regularly featuring in Adelaide's best players on a regular basis. He racked up a career high 37 disposals in a game against Collingwood in round 15, earning the first Brownlow Medal votes of his career.

In round 7 of the 2009 season, Knights made a surprising move to the forward line. This move paid off, with Knights booting three and two goals respectively in losses against the Western Bulldogs and Brisbane Lions, before managing bags of five, four and five in the Crows' impressive victories over Carlton, Hawthorn and Essendon. During this prolific period, Knights became the most accurate goalkicker in the AFL, having booted 21.3 from 24 scoring shots at that point of the 2009 season with an accuracy percentage of 87.5. 
On 25 September 2012, Knights left Adelaide. On 1 October 2012 Knights signed a contract with the Richmond Football Club during the free agency period.

Knights started off his first season at Richmond well kicking 6 goals in his first 5 games. However, in round 7 against Port Adelaide at AAMI Stadium, Knights hurt his knee which cost him his season. 

In August 2015, Knights announced he would retire at the end of the season.

Personal life
Knights is the managing director of Zib Media, a media company which operates in both Melbourne and Adelaide, building websites and performing search engine optimisation. Zib Media was a top ten finalist in the 2014 Australian Startup Awards.

Playing statistics

|- style="background-color: #EAEAEA"
! scope="row" style="text-align:center" | 2005
|
| 21 || 2 || 0 || 0 || 6 || 4 || 10 || 3 || 1 || 0.0 || 0.0 || 3.0 || 2.0 || 5.0 || 1.5 || 0.5
|-
! scope="row" style="text-align:center" | 2006
|
| 21 || 10 || 1 || 3 || 67 || 65 || 132 || 31 || 20 || 0.1 || 0.3 || 6.7 || 6.5 || 13.2 || 3.1 || 2.0
|- style="background-color: #EAEAEA"
! scope="row" style="text-align:center" | 2007
|
| 21 || 22 || 5 || 12 || 276 || 239 || 515 || 123 || 60 || 0.2 || 0.5 || 12.5 || 10.9 || 23.4 || 5.6 || 2.7
|-
! scope="row" style="text-align:center" | 2008
|
| 21 || 16 || 4 || 3 || 201 || 132 || 333 || 79 || 51 || 0.3 || 0.2 || 12.6 || 8.3 || 20.8 || 4.9 || 3.2
|- style="background-color: #EAEAEA"
! scope="row" style="text-align:center" | 2009
|
| 21 || 20 || 43 || 25 || 187 || 165 || 352 || 95 || 63 || 2.2 || 1.3 || 9.4 || 8.3 || 17.6 || 4.8 || 3.2
|-
! scope="row" style="text-align:center" | 2010
|
| 21 || 5 || 2 || 2 || 37 || 38 || 75 || 21 || 17 || 0.4 || 0.4 || 7.4 || 7.6 || 15.0 || 4.2 || 3.4
|- style="background-color: #EAEAEA"
! scope="row" style="text-align:center" | 2011
|
| 21 || 16 || 10 || 16 || 158 || 134 || 292 || 83 || 43 || 0.6 || 1.0 || 9.9 || 8.4 || 18.3 || 5.2 || 2.7
|-
! scope="row" style="text-align:center" | 2012
|
| 21 || 5 || 3 || 3 || 37 || 23 || 60 || 15 || 8 || 0.6 || 0.6 || 7.4 || 4.6 || 12.0 || 3.0 || 1.6
|- style="background-color: #EAEAEA"
! scope="row" style="text-align:center" | 2013
|
| 15 || 5 || 6 || 5 || 54 || 32 || 86 || 25 || 8 || 1.2 || 1.0 || 10.8 || 6.4 || 17.2 || 5.0 || 1.6
|-
! scope="row" style="text-align:center" | 2014
|
| 15 || 0 || — || — || — || — || — || — || — || — || — || — || — || — || — || —
|- style="background-color: #EAEAEA"
! scope="row" style="text-align:center" | 2015
|
| 15 || 1 || 1 || 0 || 3 || 1 || 4 || 1 || 3 || 1.0 || 0.0 || 3.0 || 1.0 || 4.0 || 1.0 || 3.0
|- class="sortbottom"
! colspan=3| Career
! 102
! 75
! 69
! 1026
! 833
! 1859
! 476
! 274
! 0.7
! 0.7
! 10.1
! 8.2
! 18.2
! 4.7
! 2.7
|}

References

External links

Chris Knights at looktothestars.org

Australian rules footballers from Melbourne
Adelaide Football Club players
Richmond Football Club players
Woodville-West Torrens Football Club players
1986 births
Living people
Eastern Ranges players